The Valley of Knockanure is the name of several ballads  commemorating a murder by the Royal Irish Constabulary that occurred during the Irish War of Independence at Gortaglanna (Gortagleanna) near Knockanure, County Kerry, Ireland. The best-known of these was written by teacher and poet Bryan MacMahon (d. 1998) at the request of a local schoolmaster, Pádraig Ó Ceallacháin.

Historical background
On 12 May 1921, a troop of Black and Tans were travelling out from Listowel towards Athea when they arrested four young unarmed men in Gortaglanna. Prior to this the barracks in Listowel had been burnt out and in retaliation the troops, who were under the influence of alcohol, decided to execute the young men. The first to be shot was Jerry Lyons. When this happened, Cornelius Dee decided, as he was going to be shot anyway, to make a run for it. He did, and almost immediately took a bullet in the thigh but managed to keep going. He ran for about three miles and survived. He was never recaptured but remained in hiding until the Truce. The other two men were shot on the spot. Today a memorial stands by the roadside where the three died. A film about the events was made in 2009.

Recordings
Willie Brady, 1961 
Seosamh Ó hÉanaí: The Road from Connemara (1964), re-issued on Topic TSCD518D/Cló Iar-Chonnachta CICD 143 (October 2000)
Paddy Tunney
Clancy Brothers, 1963
The Wolfe Tones
Daoirí Farrell
Sean Dunphy
Seth Staton Watkins

Bibliography
Paddy Tunney, Where Songs do Thunder (1991)
Gabriel Fitzmaurice, The World of Bryan McMahon

References

External links
Moyvane site with photos of the participants and the local area.
Website of film made about the events

Ballads
History of Ireland (1801–1923)
Irish poetry
Year of song missing